Euxesta juncta is a species of ulidiid or picture-winged fly in the genus Euxesta of the family Ulidiidae. It was described by Daniel William Coquillett in 1904.

References

juncta
Insects described in 1904
Taxa named by Daniel William Coquillett